Sir Thomas Whinfield Scholar  (born 17 December 1968) is a British civil servant who served as Permanent Secretary to the Treasury until 8 September 2022.

Scholar was previously the Prime Minister's Adviser on European and Global Issues in the Cabinet Office from 2013 to 2016. He has been a director of the nationalised bank, Northern Rock and served as Chief of Staff for Gordon Brown.

Personal life and education
Scholar was educated at Dulwich College (1979–1986), Trinity Hall, Cambridge (where he read History), and the London School of Economics. 

He is the son of Sir Michael Scholar who was Permanent Secretary of the Department of Trade and Industry between 1996 and 2001.  He has two younger brothers, Richard and John (who is a lecturer in English Literature at the University of Reading and worked at the Treasury).

Career 
Scholar joined HM Treasury in 1992, rising to Principal Private Secretary to the Chancellor of the Exchequer in 1997, serving Gordon Brown for four years until 2001. Following that posting, Scholar served as the British representative on the boards of the International Monetary Fund and the World Bank, attached to the British Embassy in Washington as Minister for Economic Affairs for six years.

In 2007, following Brown taking over the leadership of the Labour Party and thus the office of Prime Minister, Scholar returned to the UK taking over the two roles of Downing Street Chief of Staff from Jonathan Powell and of Principal Private Secretary to the Prime Minister from Oliver Robbins. After six months, Scholar left Number 10 to return to the Treasury as the Managing Director of its International and Finance Directorate in January 2008. The next year, Scholar was promoted to be the Second Permanent Secretary at the Treasury, taking over from John Kingman. In this role, Scholar was a director of the nationalised bank, Northern Rock.

Four years later, in 2013 Scholar returned to Downing Street, now under David Cameron, to run the European and Global Issues Secretariat in the Cabinet Office, and was the Prime Minister's most senior adviser on international affairs.  As of September 2015, Scholar was paid a salary of between £150,000 and £154,999, making him one of the 328 most highly paid people in the British public sector at that time.

In March 2016 the government announced that Scholar would succeed Sir Nick Macpherson as Permanent Secretary to the Treasury in April 2016. Scholar was replaced at the Cabinet Office by Oliver Robbins, who took over the role as a "post-Brexit" unit in June 2016, which the next month became the Department for Exiting the European Union when Theresa May created her first Cabinet.

He was appointed Knight Commander of the Order of the Bath (KCB) in the 2017 Birthday Honours and Knight Grand Cross of the Order of the Bath (GCB) in the 2023 New Year Honours.

He was removed from his position as permanent secretary to the Treasury by Liz Truss and Kwasi Kwarteng on 8 September 2022, a move criticised by former senior civil servants including Gus O'Donnell and Robin Butler. Following the sacking, Dave Penman, General Secretary of the FDA, accused Truss of conducting an "ideological purge" of top officials.

References 

1968 births
Living people
Alumni of the London School of Economics
Alumni of Trinity Hall, Cambridge
British special advisers
Civil servants in HM Treasury
Downing Street Chiefs of Staff
Knights Grand Cross of the Order of the Bath
People educated at Dulwich College
Permanent Secretaries of HM Treasury
Permanent Secretaries of the Cabinet Office
Principal Private Secretaries to the Prime Minister
Second Permanent Secretaries of HM Treasury